Pinqullu (Aymara for a kind of flute of the Andes, Hispanicized spelling Pencoyllo) is a mountain in the Chunta mountain range in the Andes of Peru, about  high. It lies in the Huancavelica Region, Huancavelica Province, Huancavelica District. Pinqullu is situated northwest of Kuntur Wamani and Wamanrasu.

References

Mountains of Huancavelica Region
Mountains of Peru